Vostochny (masculine), Vostochnaya (feminine), or Vostochnoye (neuter) may refer to:
Vostochny District, name of several districts and city districts in Russia
Vostochny, Kyrgyzstan, a town in Kyrgyzstan
Vostochny, Russia (Vostochnaya, Vostochnoye), name of several inhabited localities in Russia
Vostochny Cosmodrome, a cosmodrome in Amur Oblast, Russia
Vostochny Port, a port in Primorsky Krai, Russia
Vostochny, alternative name of the Tashkent International Airport in Uzbekistan
Vostochny Bank